Permeability, permeable, and semipermeable may refer to:

Chemistry

Semipermeable membrane, a membrane which will allow certain molecules or ions to pass through it by diffusion
Vascular permeability, the movement of fluids and molecules between the vascular and extravascular compartments
Permeation of a gas or vapor through a solid substance

Earth and soil science

Permeability (earth sciences),  a measure of the ability of a material (such as rocks) to transmit fluids
Relative permeability, in multiphase flow in porous media
Permeability (foundry sand),  a test of the venting characteristics of a rammed foundry sand
Hydraulic conductivity, the permeability of soil for water

Electromagnetism

Permeability (electromagnetism), the degree of magnetization of a material in response to a magnetic field
Vacuum permeability, permeability of free space or magnetic constant, a physical constant, the value of magnetic permeability in a classical vacuum

Vehicles and transport

Permeability (nautical), in ship design, the percentage of empty space in a compartment or tank
Permeability (spatial and transport planning), the extent to which the layout of urban forms enables people or vehicles to move in different directions

Other uses
Air permeability, characteristic of textile fabrics, measuring the ease of passage of air through them
"Impermeable" (song), a song by Ha*Ash
Permeable Press, an American publishing company